BB5 is an Indian Kannada language thriller film written and directed by Janardhan N. It features Poornachandra Mysore and Radhika Chetan in the lead roles. Rajesh Nataranga, Rashmi Prabhakar and Giriraj B. M. feature in key supporting roles. The score and soundtrack for the film is by Chethan Kumar Shastry and the cinematography is by  Chethan Royie.

The film released on 26 May 2017.

Cast
 Poornachandra Mysore
 Radhika Chetan as Kriti
 Rajesh Nataranga
 Rashmi Prabhakar
 Giriraj B. M.

Soundtrack

The film's score and soundtrack was composed by Chethan Kumar Shastry. The lyrics for the songs are written by Janardhan. N.

Reception 
Times of India rated it as 3 out of 5.

References

External links
 
 

2017 films
2010s Kannada-language films
2010s mystery thriller films
Indian mystery thriller films
2017 directorial debut films